Taudaijang is a village near Nungba in  Noney district of Manipur, India.  Taudaijang comes under Nungba post office and the Postal Index Number is 795147.

References

Villages in Noney district